Emile Louis Bruno Clement (1844–1928) was a prominent collector of ethnographic artefacts and natural history specimens from northwest Australia at the end of the nineteenth and early twentieth centuries.

Biography
Emile Clement was born in Muskau, Niederschlesischer, Oberlausitzkreis, Sachsen, Lower Silesia (Prussia) in early 1844—now called Bad Muskau and situated in the Federal State of Saxony on the border with Poland (Polish name: Muskau (Muzaków)). He died at Hove in Sussex on 4 August 1928, aged 84 and was buried in the south aspect of Hove cemetery. His wife Emily Elizabeth died two years later and was buried alongside her husband.

Throughout his life, Dr Clement pursued a variety of occupations, including archaeologist, teacher, naturalist, mining engineer, ethnographer, children's book author, and ethnographic dealer.

During the period 1877 to 1890 Dr Clement undertook a series of archaeological excavations in Silesia, and sold collections of Silesian Bronze Age archaeological material to museums throughout the United Kingdom including the British Museum, the Department of Science and Art museums in Edinburgh, Cardiff and Dublin, the Museum of Archaeology and Anthropology, University of Cambridge and the Reading Museum.

However Dr Clement's largest contribution to museums was the sale or donation of numerous collections of Western Australian Aboriginal artefacts to museums throughout Britain and Europe.  During the period 1896-1928, Clement sold over 1600 Australian Aboriginal artefacts from Western Australia to museums throughout England, Scotland, Ireland, and continental Europe. In many of these museums the Clement material comprises a substantial part of their total holdings of Australian Aboriginal material.

Dr Clement made three trips to Western Australia: 1895; 1896–1898; and 1899-1900. These trips related to his involvement with establishing and later managing a number of gold mines around the Towranna and Roebourne regions. Among these mines were the Towranna Gold Mines of WA Ltd lease at Towranna[aka Toweranna] and leases held by the Lydia Exploration Syndicate on the Lower Nickol field northwest of Roebourne.

Clement's views on the relationship between Aboriginal people and settlers are recorded in an 1899 letter to the St James's Gazette.

A study of the acquisition of different museums holdings of Western Australian Aboriginal objects related to Clement material suggests there were two distinct stages to Dr Clement's involvement. The early collections (1896–1910) were collected by Dr Clement, some probably with the assistance of his son Adolphe Emile Clement, who worked as mine manager at Towranna.  In contrast, the collections acquired by museums during the second stage (1923–1928) seem to be derived from residents from the North-west area of Western Australia, who sent the material to Dr Clement in England, who then sold it to museums.

As well as the ethnographic and archaeological material, Dr Clement contributed substantial quantities of botanical material from Northwest Australia to the Royal Botanic Garden, Kew between 1898 and 1900, as well as to herbaria in Leiden and Berlin. Collections of his zoological material, containing many type specimens, are held in the British Museum (Natural History), Liverpool Museum and the Oxford University Museum.

Dr Clement's collections

Museums holding collections of Western Australian Aboriginal material acquired from Dr Clement

Museums holding collections of German Bronze Age material acquired from Clement
British Museum – acquired in 1877
National Museum of Scotland – acquired in 1877
Museum of Archaeology and Anthropology, University of Cambridge
National Museum of Wales
National Museum of Ireland – acquired in 1883
Reading Museum – acquired in 1885
Ashmolean Museum – acquired in 1886

Institutions holding collections of natural history material acquired from Clement
Herbarium, Royal Botanic Gardens, Kew
Natural History Museum, London
Oxford University Museum of Natural History
Botanischer Garten und Botanisches Museum, Berlin-Dahlem
Nationaal Herbarium Nederland, Leiden

Flora named after Clement

Zoological type specimens collected by Clement
Cephaloplatys clementii, sp. n.
Pseudælia clementi, sp. n.
Roebournea diversa

References

External links
Letter from Clement to London's St James Gazette, dated 5 April 1899, describing his experiences in Western Australia 

1928 deaths
German ethnographers
People associated with the British Museum
People associated with the Pitt Rivers Museum
1844 births
People from the Province of Silesia
Collectors